The Battle of Bamberg took place on 9 March 1632 during the Thirty Years' War. The army of the Catholic League led by Count Tilly surprised and routed the Swedes led by Gustav Horn and captured the city.

Background
After his victory at the Battle of Breitenfeld, the Swedish king Gustavus Adolphus conquered large parts of northern and central Germany in 1631. The troops of the Emperor and of the Catholic League were pushed back to Westphalia, Bavaria and Austria. The bulk of the Swedish army wintered around Mainz, where Gustavus Adolphus had set up his headquarters.

Part of the Swedish army under General Horn remained active and conquered several places in Franconia. He had only two Swedish regiments, the rest of his 12,000 troops being German recruits. On 10 February Horn captured the episcopal city of Bamberg, the capital of the Prince-Bishopric of the same name. The defense of the city was left to the civilians and militia of the prince-bishopric, because the professional units of the Catholic League had fled the city. After a siege of only nine hours, the city's defenders surrendered to the Swedes as they ran out of ammunition.

Battle
The Catholic League led by Count Tilly began its counterattack in March. Tilly gathered the garrisons from the Upper Palatinate and added 8,000 men of the Bavarian militia to his army. From Nördlingen he marched with his army to Bamberg, arriving on the evening of 9 March. The vanguard raided the Swedish cavalry posts outside the city. The fleeing cavalrymen caused panic among the defenders in the eastern part of Bamberg. The League army broke through the defenses at the Monastery of the Holy Sepulchre. The eastern part of the city with unfinished trenches was quickly abandoned by the defenders, but the bridge over the Regnitz which gave access to the center was fiercely defended. When two of Horn's regiments managed to completely recapture the bridge, Tilly ordered two heavy guns to be placed in a beer garden overlooking the bridge. After a shelling, the bridge had to be abandoned. The Swedish commander, the Count of Solms-Laubach, died from the injuries sustained during the shelling. The fighting lasted until midnight, after which the Swedish army gave up the defence. Horn lost a third of his men, mainly through desertion, and withdrew to Schweinfurt.

Aftermath
Count Tilly was too weak to further exploit his success in Bamberg. Gustavus Adolphus needed another victory after the Swedish defeat to convince his various German allies, such as Württemberg, to continue supporting Sweden. The king marched from Mainz to Nuremberg, absorbing Horn's remnants. On March 31, Gustavus Adolphus arrived in Nuremberg, where he was welcomed as a hero. A week later he captured Donauwörth, murdering surrendering Catholic troops and friendly Protestant burghers and gathered enough men to invade Bavaria.

Citations

Bibliography
 

1632 in Europe
Conflicts in 1632
Bamberg 1632
Bamberg 1632
Bamberg 1632
17th century in Bavaria
Battles in Bavaria
Battles inscribed on the Arc de Triomphe
Bamberg